Foxlease is a training and activity centre of Girlguiding near Lyndhurst, Hampshire, UK. The Foxlease estate has been owned and managed by the Guides since 1922. Foxlease hosted the Guides' Third International Conference, the Sixth World Conference and also the first World Camp.

The Property

The Princess Mary House 
The Princess Mary House, a Georgian house renamed in honour of Princess Mary's marriage, still has Adam fireplaces and a Strawberry Hill Gothic lounge. Individual rooms have been adopted by Guides from around the world and personalised by them. Modernisation has created conference and residential facilities. These including training and meeting rooms, and accommodation for overnight stays.

Princess Margaret Lodge
Princess Margaret Lodge was built to replace Beaverbrook Lodge. It accommodates self-catering groups and there is disabled access on both floors. It was opened in 2005 by The Countess of Wessex, then President of Girlguiding

The Coach House

The Coach house is a listed building, constructed in the 18th century. It provides self-catering accommodation.

The Barn
The Barn is self-catering accommodation. Early photos show a thatched roof, but this barn was burnt down in 1958 and has since been replaced with a modern building.

Campsites
There are several campsites at Foxlease, including Cedars, Katherine Wilson, Birches, Appletree and Bridges. Most of the sites have a shelter with a toilet and shower block. Most of the campsites close at the end of September for the winter, but Katherine Wilson and Appletree are kept open.

Activity facilities
There is a 9m climbing wall, a low rope course, a high rope course and a covered, heated swimming pool. Kayaking and rafting facilities are also available. There are also nature trails.

History
Henry Weyland Powell (1787–1840), educated at Trinity College, Cambridge 1807, joined the Grenadier Guards in 1808, served in the Peninsular War, and as a lieutenant at Quatre Bras and Waterloo. He was appointed High Sheriff of Hampshire in 1834, and was described as "of Foxlease, Hants".  He was buried at Fulham  Cemetery.  His father Thomas Powell (1735–1820) was in partnership with his brother David (1725–1810).  Another brother was James Powell (1737–1824); all three (and another brother, Baden) were children of David Powell (1695–1784) and Susannah Thistlethwayte, née Baden (1696–1762).  David and James were the grandfathers of the Rev. Prof Baden Powell, who was the father of Robert Baden-Powell, founder of Scouting.

Acquisition by Girlguiding UK

Some time after the marriage in 1906 of Armar Dayrolles Saunderson (1872–1952) from Ireland to the American Anne Archbold (1886–1968), they bought Foxlease.  But the marriage turned sour, and in 1921, Foxlease was put up for sale. Hampshire Girl Guides asked for and received permission to camp there and several training weeks were held there during 1921.

Despite the suitability of the property and the need for such a venue, the committee's considered opinion was that the Guides did not have sufficient resources for the upkeep and it would not be wise to accept the gift.

The offer coincided with the preparations for the marriage of Princess Mary, who happened to be president of the Girl Guides Association. Less than a week before the Royal wedding, Rose Kerr was contacted by Lady Mary Trefusis (Lady of the Bedchamber to Queen Mary), because Olave Baden-Powell, the World Chief Guide, was not in London. Lady Trefusis was on the committee of a fund to which all the Marys of the British Empire had contributed, for a wedding present to the princess. The princess insisted that she could only accept a portion of the fund as a personal gift. Trefusis proposed to Kerr that the remainder be spent buying a training centre for the Girl Guides, a cause close to the princess's heart. Kerr suggested that the fund could furnish and equip Foxlease, but this was not immediately accepted as the fund wanted a place that would be associated with Princess Mary's name. As the matter had to be settled by the next day, Kerr gave Trefusis the phone number of Pax Hill, the Baden-Powells' home.

Olave Baden-Powell was in bed with 'flu when she received the phone call, but she went to see Princess Mary at Buckingham Palace the next day. Mrs Saunderson was consulted and the outcome was that her gift was accepted. The house was renamed The Princess Mary House and Princess Mary gave £6,000 from the fund to furnish and equip the house. Later she gave £4,000, half the proceeds of the exhibition of her wedding gifts, towards the upkeep of the property.

Alice Behrens was appointed the first Guider-in-Charge. Each room was adopted by Guides from a country, county of Britain or school and embellished and furnished by them. Helen Storrow gave the money to equip the small lodge and Juliette Low stayed in it for several weeks to get it in order. Senator and Mrs William A. Clark furnished the Garden Room in memory of their daughter, after whom Camp Andree Clark (now part of the Edith Macy Conference Center) in the US is named.

Foxlease was opened on 2 June 1922. The Second International Conference was in session in Cambridge at that time, so 24 Guiders from the conference visited for a short training course.

Third International Conference

The Third International Conference was held at the same time as the first World Camp.

World Camp

The first World Camp took place from 16–24 July 1924. Olave Baden-Powell and Olivia Burges formulated the idea in September 1923, during the latter's stay at Pax Hill. The original invitation was for six Guides and one Guider from each country where there were Guides. However, this was modified to accommodate those who were willing and able to send more. In total 1100 girls and women attended, 600 of which were from overseas. Forty countries were represented.

Sixth World Conference

The Sixth World Conference was held at Foxlease from 5–12 July 1930. Helen Gwynne-Vaughan chaired this conference at which the constitution of the World Association of Girl Guides and Girl Scouts, drawn up at the previous international conference, was settled. Olave Baden-Powell was also unanimously voted World Chief Guide by the twenty-eight countries recognised by the World Bureau. This conference also approved the idea of a World Flag, an idea originally proposed by South Africa some years earlier.

The first International Trainers' Conference was held simultaneously with the World Conference.

Gifts from around the Globe

New Zealand
In 1926, each member of the New Zealand Guide Association gave one penny.  This bought a wooden inlaid writing desk made of New Zealand timber which was given to Foxlease.

Plans for the future
Plans are being drawn up for the creation of a "Museum of Guiding" to hold the extensive Guiding archives currently in store.

See also
Broneirion
Edith Macy Conference Center
Gilwell Park
Waddow Hall
All the Marys of the Empire fundraiser

References

External links
Foxlease page from Girlguiding

Sites of Special Scientific Interest in Hampshire
Girlguiding
Places associated with Scouting